Feed My Starving Children is a Christian non-profit organization that coordinates the packaging and distribution of food to people in developing nations. Founded in 1987, it has reached out to more than 70 countries.

Founding 
Richard Proudfit, a Minneapolis business man and philanthropist, founded the organization after visiting Honduras after a hurricane. Proudfit witnessed starving children dying all around him and was moved to start Feed My Starving Children in 1987. Proudfit risked his life in war zones around the world to feed starving children. Proudfit died November 13th, 2018. Together with his second foundation Kids Against Hunger, the two organizations feed over 1 billion children annually. Proudfit received the Jefferson Award for Public Service in 2012 joining the ranks of Bill Gates and Paul Newman.

Current Operation 
The organization recruits volunteers including school children to assist in packing. They also employ paid staff to supervise the operations.

FMSC has 8 packing facilities, 3 in Minnesota (Coon Rapids, Eagan and Chanhassen), 3 in Illinois (Aurora, Libertyville and Schaumburg), one in Richardson, Texas and one in Mesa, Arizona.  Each site runs 4-5 packing sessions per day.  Volunteers can sign up for packing sessions, which are currently 1 hour and 45 minutes long, at the website FMSC.org.  Children must be 5 years old to pack, and those under 18 must be accompanied by an adult.

FMSC currently sends food to 70 countries, working with groups (churches, clinics, schools, etc.) in various countries to get the food to those who need it.  The food is free, but recipients must pay shipping costs.  FMSC currently packs three different formulas, each of which is formulated to meet the needs of various groups:  MannaPack Rice for general distribution, MannaPack D for those with digestive problems, and MannaPack W for weaning infants. Although FMSC is a Christian organization, recipients do not have to be Christian to get food, nor are those who volunteer to pack food required to be Christian.

Funding 
FMSC receives no federal funding: all funds come from donors and from their online and on site MarketPlace, which features handcrafted items made by artisans in various countries.  Selling these items provides those artisans with a fair wage, and the profits go towards funding more meals for children around the world.

References

External links
 Feed My Starving Children
 Business Journals - Feed My Starving Children moves to Mesa, opens mega center
Organizations established in 1987
Philanthropic organizations based in the United States
International medical and health organizations
Christian relief organizations